Smith Creek is a stream in White County of the American state of Georgia, and is a tributary of the Chattahoochee River.

Smith Creek was named after Nathan Smith, a pioneer settler.

Course

Smith Creek rises in the very northeastern corner of White County, Georgia, where White County meets Habersham County, on the western edge of Hickorynut Ridge, and south of Tray Mountain, at the base of Anna Ruby Falls and the confluence of York Creek and East Fork Smith Creek. The creek runs south and forms Unicoi Lake, a reservoir created by Unicoi State Park Lake Dam, a United States Army Corps of Engineers project in Unicoi State Park, then turns sharply west and flows into the Chattahoochee River in northern Helen, right off of State Route 75.

Sub-watershed details
The creek watershed is designated by the United States Geological Survey as sub-watershed HUC 031300010102, is named Smith Creek-Chattahoochee River sub-watershed, and drains an area of approximately 27 square miles north of Helen, and east of the Chattahoochee River.

See also
 List of rivers of Georgia (U.S. state)
 Water Resource Region
 South Atlantic-Gulf Water Resource Region
 Apalachicola basin

References

External links
 Smith Creek and Anna Ruby Falls

Smith Creek (Chattahoochee River)
Rivers of White County, Georgia